Freddy Castillo (born June 15, 1955) is a Mexican retired professional boxer who is the former WBC light flyweight champion, WBC and Lineal flyweight champion.

Pro career 
Known as "Chato Loco", Castillo turned pro in 1971 and won the WBC light flyweight title with a TKO win over Luis Estaba in 1978. He lost the belt in his first defense later that year to Netrnoi Sor Vorasingh by split decision. He later moved up in weight and in 1982 won the WBC and lineal flyweight titles with a decision win over Prudencio Cardona. He lost the titles in his first defense to Eleoncio Mercedes by split decision. He retired in 1986 after losing to Sot Chitalada for the WBC flyweight title in Kuwait City, Kuwait. He also lost to Alfonso Lopez

Professional boxing record

See also
List of flyweight boxing champions
List of light flyweight boxing champions
List of WBC world champions
List of Mexican boxing world champions

References

External links 
 
 Freddy Castillo - CBZ Profile

1955 births
Living people
Boxers from Yucatán (state)
Sportspeople from Mérida, Yucatán
World Boxing Council champions
World light-flyweight boxing champions
World boxing champions
Mexican male boxers